The 1992–93 Czechoslovak Extraliga season was the 50th season of the Czechoslovak Extraliga, the top level of ice hockey in Czechoslovakia. 14 teams participated in the league, and HC Sparta Prague won the championship.

This was the last season of the league due to the peaceful dissolution of Czechoslovakia midway through the seasonwhich all Slovak and Czech teams played to completion. The 1993–94 hockey season would be the first for the newly founded Czech Extraliga and Slovak Extraliga.

Regular season

Playoffs

Pre-Playoffs

 HC Košice – DS Olomouc 5:0 (1:0,1:0,3:0)
 HC Košice – DS Olomouc 4:3 (0:1,2:2,2:0)
 DS Olomouc – HC Košice 3:4 SO (1:0,2:0,0:3,0:0)
 AC ZPS Zlín – Dukla Jihlava 4:1 (3:1,0:0,1:0)
 AC ZPS Zlín – Dukla Jihlava 3:2 OT (1:1,0:1,1:0,1:0)
 Dukla Jihlava – AC ZPS Zlín 5:3 (1:0,1:1,3:2)
 Dukla Jihlava – AC ZPS Zlín 6:1 (2:1,1:0,3:0)
 AC ZPS Zlín – Dukla Jihlava 3:2 (1:1,0:1,2:0)
 Poldi Kladno – ŠKP PS Poprad 6:2 (0:0,2:2,4:0)
 Poldi Kladno –  ŠKP PS Poprad 4:0 (1:0,1:0,2:0)
 ŠKP PS Poprad –  Poldi Kladno 4:3 (0:1,1:1,3:1)
 ŠKP PS Poprad –  Poldi Kladno 5:0 Forfait (3:0,2:1,-:-) 
 Poldi Kladno –  HC Poprad 5:0 Forfeit
 Motor České Budějovice – HC Pardubice 1:2 (1:1,0:1,0:0)
 Motor České Budějovice – HC Pardubice 3:5 (0:1,3:1,0:3)
 HC Pardubice – Motor České Budějovice 1:0 (0:0,0:0,1:0)

Quarterfinals 
 HC Chemopetrol Litvínov – HC Pardubice 3:2 OT (0:1,1:1,1:0,1:0)
 HC Chemopetrol Litvínov – HC Pardubice 6:3 (2:1,1:1,3:1)
 HC Pardubice – HC Chemopetrol Litvínov 0:4 (0:3,0:0,0:1)
 HC Sparta Prag – AC ZPS Zlín 5:0 (1:0,2:0,2:0)
 HC Sparta Prag – AC ZPS Zlín 5:2 (1:0,1:1,3:1)
 AC ZPS Zlín – HC Sparta Prag 3:2 (0:1,1:0,2:1)
 AC ZPS Zlín – HC Sparta Prag 2:4 (1:1,1:3,0:0)
 Dukla Trenčín – HC Košice 5:1 (0:0,2:1,3:0)
 Dukla Trenčín – HC Košice 4:2 (2:1,1:1,1:0)
 HC Košice – Dukla Trenčín 2:4 (1:2,1:1,0:1)
 Vítkovice – Poldi Kladno 2:1 (0:1,0:0,2:0)
 HC Vítkovice – Poldi Kladno 5:4 (3:2,2:1,0:1)
 Poldi Kladno – HC Vítkovice 4:2 (1:0,0:1,3:1)
 Poldi Kladno – HC Vítkovice 3:0 (1:0,0:0,2:0)
 HC Vítkovice – Poldi Kladno 9:1 (2:1,6:0,1:0)

Semifinal 
 HC Chemopetrol Litvínov – HC Vítkovice 2:6 (1:2,1:1,0:3)
 HC Chemopetrol Litvínov – HC Vítkovice 2:7 (1:4,0:0,1:3)
 HC Vítkovice – HC Chemopetrol Litvínov 7:8 OT (1:5,6:2,0:0,0:1)
 Vítkovice – HC Chemopetrol Litvínov 4:5 SO (1:1,1:1,2:2,0:0)
 HC Chemopetrol Litvínov – HC Vítkovice 2:3 (1:2,1:1,0:0)
 HC Sparta Prag – Dukla Trenčín 9:3 (2:1,5:1,2:1)
 HC Sparta Prag – Dukla Trenčín 4:3 (3:0,1:2,0:1)
 Dukla Trenčín – HC Sparta Prag 4:3 (3:0,0:0,1:3)
 Dukla Trenčín – HC Sparta Prag 4:1 (1:1,1:0,2:0)
 HC Sparta Prag – Dukla Trenčín 7:2 (1:0,3:1,3:1)

Final 
 HC Sparta Prag – HC Vítkovice 5:3 (2:0,1:2,2:1)
 HC Sparta Prag – HC Vítkovice  1:2 OT (0:0,1:1,0:0,0:1)
 HC Vítkovice – HC Sparta Prag 4:5 (1:1,2:3,1:1)
 HC Vítkovice – HC Sparta Prag 4:5 (1:1,2:1,1:3)

3rd place
 HC Dukla Trenčín – HC Chemopetrol Litvínov 4:3 (1:0,2:1,1:2)
 HC Chemopetrol Litvínov – HC Dukla Trenčín 4:3 (3:1,1:2,0:0)
 HC Chemopetrol Litvínov – HC Dukla Trenčín 3:4 (1:2,1:1,1:1)

External links
History of Czechoslovak ice hockey

Czechoslovak Extraliga seasons
Czechoslovak
1992–93 in Czechoslovak ice hockey